Iskender Alptekin (29 August 1961 – 18 May 2010), also known as Matay Rabo, was an Aramaic politician, musician and the President of the European Syriac Union (ESU).

Biography
Iskender Alptekin was born on 29 August 1961 in the Kafro village in Tur Abdin, Turkey. He passed his childhood at the village while studying the primary at the same time learning Syriac language. He left his village in 1977 for Istanbul to find work. In 1978 he married Ferida Cacan and emigrated to Switzerland. He was the father of two daughters. In Switzerland he became active in  Syriac politics, joining various national conferences in Europe, the United States, and Australia.

Iskender Alptekin became the first chairman of the newly established European Syriac Union on 14 May 2004. He was again unanimously re-elected at the second ESU Congress in 2007.

Death
On 18 May 2010, Alptekin died of a heart attack in Switzerland.

See also
European Syriac Union

References

Swiss politicians of Assyrian descent
Swiss people of Assyrian descent
1961 births
2010 deaths
Assyrian politicians